In the 1976 Intertoto Cup no knock-out rounds were contested, and therefore no winner was declared. This edition marked the first time teams from Israel took part.

Group stage
The teams were divided into eleven groups of four teams each.

Group 1

Group 2

Group 3

Group 4

Group 5

Group 6

Group 7

Group 8

Group 9

Group 10

Group 11

See also
 1976–77 European Cup
 1976–77 UEFA Cup Winners' Cup
 1976–77 UEFA Cup

External links
  by Pawel Mogielnicki

1976
4